The Greek Ambassador to Australia is the Greek Government's primary diplomatic representative in the Commonwealth of Australia. The Greek Ambassador to Australia also holds non-resident accreditation to New Zealand, Fiji, the Solomon Islands, Papua New Guinea, Kiribati, Samoa, Tonga, and Nauru.

Ambassadors of Greece to Australia 
The holders of the post since its establishment in 1953 are:

 Dimitri M. Lambros (30/3/1953 - 8/9/1956)
 George Christodoulou (19/12/1956 - 25/8/1961)
 P. Anninos Cavalieratos (23/11/1961 - 11/7/1963)
 Basil Tsamissis (17/8/1965 - 5/7/1971)
 Alexis Stephanou (8/9/1971 - 16/3/1974)
 Nikolaos Diamantopoulos (23/1/1975 - 28/8/1980)
 Alexander Vayenas (21/10/1980 - 30/3/1985)
 Efthymios Tzaferis (19/4/1985 - 22/12/1990)
 Vassilis Zafiropoulos (7/5/1991 - 24/11/1993)
 George Constantis (29/12/1993 - 9/6/1997)
 Ioannis Beveratos (7/7/1997 - 19/12/2001)
 Fotios–Jean Xydas (7/3/2002 - 15/12/2005)
 George Zois (28/8/2006 - 5/9/2009)
 Alexios G. Christopoulos (17/9/2009 - 9/8/2012)
 Charalampos Dafaranos (1/11/2012 - 9/1/2016)
 Ekaterini Xagorari (24/02/2016 - 2019) 
 Georges Papacostas (20/2/2020-)

References 

Australia
 
Greece